Rushcliffe is a constituency in Nottinghamshire represented in the House of Commons of the UK Parliament from 2019 by Ruth Edwards, a Conservative.

From 1970 until 2019, it was represented by Kenneth Clarke who was Father of the House of Commons for his last two years as an MP. He was appointed to the executive in the governments of Margaret Thatcher, John Major and David Cameron – one of five ministers to serve the whole 18 years of the Thatcher and Major governments. His political career is the fifth-longest in the modern era; he remains a notable figure in British politics.

History
The constituency was formed by the Redistribution of Seats Act 1885 (for first use during the election that year).

Since 1950 it has been a safe seat for the Conservative Party, whose members have held it without marginal majorities, except for a four-year period from 1966 when it was held by Labour, coinciding with the first Wilson ministry. Unlike other constituencies nearby, such as Broxtowe and Gedling, which were previously held by the Conservatives, they retained Rushcliffe in the 1997 New Labour landslide.

In the 2016 European Union membership referendum, it was the only constituency in the Nottinghamshire and overall East Midlands region to vote Remain (57.6% to 42.4%), even as neighboring city of Nottingham voted to Leave (50.8% to 49.2%). This can be attributed to the constituency's affluence, as well as then-MP Kenneth Clarke's pro-EU political leanings (he would be the only Conservative MP to vote against triggering Article 50 in 2017.)

Boundaries

1885–1918: Part of the Sessional Division of Nottingham.

1918–1950: The Urban Districts of Beeston, Carlton, and West Bridgford, the Rural Districts of Leake and Stapleford, the Rural District which consisted of the parishes of Kingston-on-Soar and Ratcliffe-on-Soar, and in the Rural District of Basford the parishes of Awsworth, Barton-in-Fabis, Bilborough, Bradmore, Bunny, Burton Joyce, Clifton-with-Glapton, Colwick, Cossall, Gamston, Gedling, Gotham, Nuthall, Ruddington, South Wilford, Stoke Bardolph, Strelley, Thrumpton, Trowell, and Wollaton.

1950–1955: The Urban Districts of Beeston and Stapleford, and West Bridgford, and in the Rural District of Basford the parishes of Barton-in-Fabis, Bilborough, Bradmore, Bunny, Clifton with Glapton, Colwick, Costock, East Leake, Gedling, Gotham, Kingston-on-Soar, Normanton-on-Soar, Ratcliffe-on-Soar, Rempstone, Ruddington, Stanford-on-Soar, Sutton Bonington, Thorpe-in-the-Glebe, Thrumpton, West Leake, Willoughby-on-the-Wolds, and Wysall.

1955–1974: The Urban District of Beeston and Stapleford, and in the Rural District of Basford the parishes of Barton-in-Fabis, Bilborough, Bradmore, Bunny, Colwick, Costock, East Leake, Gedling, Gotham, Kingston-on-Soar, Normanton-on-Soar, Ratcliffe-on-Soar, Rempstone, Ruddington, Stanford-on-Soar, Sutton Bonington, Thorpe-in-the-Glebe, Thrumpton, West Leake, Willoughby-on-the-Wolds, and Wysall.

1974–1983: The Urban District of West Bridgford, the Rural District of Bingham, and in the Rural District of Basford the parishes of Barton-in-Fabis, Bradmore, Bunny, Costock, East Leake, Gotham, Kingston on Soar, Normanton on Soar, Ratcliffe on Soar, Rempstone, Ruddington, Stanford on Soar, Sutton Bonington, Thorpe in the Glebe, Thrumpton, West Leake, Willoughby-on-the-Wolds, and Wysall.

1983–2010: The Borough of Rushcliffe.

2010–present: The Borough of Rushcliffe wards of Abbey, Compton Acres, Cotgrave, Edwalton Village, Gamston, Gotham, Keyworth North, Keyworth South, Lady Bay, Leake, Lutterell, Manvers, Melton, Musters, Nevile, Ruddington, Soar Valley, Stanford, Sutton Bonington, Tollerton, Trent, Trent Bridge, Wiverton, and Wolds.

Constituency profile
The main town in the constituency is West Bridgford, which is part of the Greater Nottingham urban area, and includes the Trent Bridge cricket ground and Nottingham Forest F.C., and has some strong Labour wards like Trent Bridge itself and Lady Bay. The remainder of the constituency is predominantly rural and Conservative, including the villages of Cotgrave, East Leake, Sutton Bonington, Keyworth, Radcliffe on Trent and Ruddington.

The constituency consists of Census Output Areas of one local government district with a working population whose income is close to the national average and has lower than average reliance upon social housing.  At the end of 2012 the unemployment rate in the constituency stood as 1.9% of the population claiming jobseekers allowance, compared to the regional average of 3.5%. The borough contributing to the bulk of the seat has a low 15.1% of its population without a car, 16.4% of the population without qualifications and a very high 39.0% with level 4 qualifications or above.  In terms of tenure a high 76.7% of homes are owned outright or on a mortgage as at the 2011 census across the district.

Members of Parliament

Elections

Elections in the 2010s

Elections in the 2000s

Elections in the 1990s

Elections in the 1980s

Elections in the 1970s

Elections in the 1960s

Elections in the 1950s

Election in the 1940s

Elections in the 1930s

Elections in the 1920s

Elections in the 1910s

Elections in the 1900s

Elections in the 1890s

Elections in the 1880s

See also
List of parliamentary constituencies in Nottinghamshire

Notes

References

Parliamentary constituencies in Nottinghamshire
Constituencies of the Parliament of the United Kingdom established in 1885
Rushcliffe
Kenneth Clarke